The 1998 International Tennis Championships, also known as America's Red Clay Championships, was a men's tennis tournament held in Coral Springs, Florida, United States. The event was part of the World Series category of the 1998 ATP Tour. The tournament was played on outdoor clay courts and was held from May 4 through May 11, 1998. Qualifier Andrew Ilie won the singles title.

Finals

Singles

 Andrew Ilie defeated  Davide Sanguinetti, 7–5, 6–4
 It was Ilie's only title of the year and the 1st of his career.

Doubles

 Grant Stafford /  Kevin Ullyett defeated  Mark Merklein /  Vincent Spadea, 7–5, 6–4
 It was Stafford's 2nd title of the year and the 3rd of his career. It was Ullyett's 3rd title of the year and the 4th of his career.

References

International Tennis Championships
International Tennis Championships
International Tennis Championships
International Tennis Championships
Delray Beach Open
Coral Springs, Florida